1917 in Argentine football saw the two teams from Avellaneda dominate Argentine football. Racing Club won its fifth consecutive league title and two domestic cups, while Independiente won the Copa de Competencia Jockey Club.

In international football Argentina won three minor tournaments but finished as runners up to Uruguay in Copa América for the second time.

Primera División
Sportivo Barracas made its debut in Primera División, while Gimnasia y Esgrima (BA) and Banfield were relegated at the end of the season.

Final standings

Lower divisions

Intermedia
Champion: Defensores de Belgrano

Segunda División
Champion: Sportivo Palermo

Tercera División
Champion: San Lorenzo

Domestic cups

Copa de Honor Municipalidad de Buenos Aires
Champion: Racing Club

Final

Copa de Competencia Jockey Club
Champion: Independiente

Final

Copa Ibarguren
Champion: Racing Club

Final

International cups

Tie Cup
Champions:  Wandereres

Final

Copa de Honor Cousenier
Champions:  Nacional

Final

Copa Dr. Ricardo C. Aldao
Champions:  Racing Club

Final

Replay

Argentina national team

Copa América
Argentina travelled to Uruguay to participate in the 2nd edition of Copa América. For the second time they finished in second place behind Uruguay.

Titles
Copa Círculo de la Prensa 1917
Copa Lipton 1917
Copa Premier Honor Uruguayo 1917

Results

Notes

References

 
Seasons in Argentine football